Melanella atlantica is a species of sea snail, a marine gastropod mollusk in the family Eulimidae. The species is one of many species known to exist within the genus, Melanella.

Distribution
This species occurs in the following locations:

 Angola
 Cape Verde
 Gulf of Guinea
 Saint Helena
 Senegal
 West Africa

References

atlantica
Gastropods described in 1890
Molluscs of the Atlantic Ocean
Molluscs of Angola
Gastropods of Cape Verde
Invertebrates of Cameroon
Invertebrates of Gabon
Invertebrates of São Tomé and Príncipe
Invertebrates of West Africa
Fauna of Saint Helena